San Mateo is a town and municipality in the Quetzaltenango department of Guatemala.

References 

Municipalities of the Quetzaltenango Department